Sirois is a surname. Notable people with the surname include:

Allan Sirois (born 1975), Canadian ice hockey player
Anne-Marie Sirois (born 1958), Canadian visual artist, writer and film director
Bob Sirois (born 1954), Canadian ice hockey player
Charles Sirois (born 1954), Canadian businessman
Edward Sirois (1898–1968), American politician and Massachusetts National Guard officer
Joe Sirois (born 1972), American drummer 
Leon Sirois (born 1935), American racing driver
Myriam Sirois (born 1975), Canadian actress and voice actress
Richard Sirois (disambiguation)
Rich Sirois (born 1957), Canadian hockey player
Richard Z. Sirois (born 1956), Canadian radio personality
Tyler Sirois (born 1984), American politician

See also 
Sirois Lake, a freshwater body of the Mauvaise River watershed, in Quebec, Canada
Sirois hearing, a legal hearing